An arch dam is a concrete dam that is curved upstream in plan. The arch dam is designed so that the force of the water against it, known as hydrostatic pressure, presses against the arch, causing the arch to straighten slightly and strengthening the structure as it pushes into its foundation or abutments. An arch dam is most suitable for narrow canyons or gorges with steep walls of stable rock to support the structure and stresses. Since they are thinner than any other dam type, they require much less construction material, making them economical and practical in remote areas.

Classification
In general, arch dams are classified based on the ratio of the base thickness to the structural height (b/h) as:
 Thin, for b/h less than 0.2, 
 Medium-thick, for b/h between 0.2 and 0.3, and 
 Thick, for b/h ratio over 0.3.

Arch dams classified with respect to their structural height are:

History 

The development of arch dams throughout history began with the Romans in the 1st century BC and after several designs and techniques were developed, relative uniformity was achieved in the 20th century. The first known arch dam, the Glanum Dam, also known as the Vallon de Baume Dam, was built by the Romans in France and it dates back to the 1st century BC. The Romans built it to supply nearby Glanum with water.

The Monte Novo Dam in Portugal was another early arch dam built by the Romans in 300 AD. The curved ends of the dam met with two winged walls that were later supported by two buttresses. The dam also contained two water outlets to drive mills downstream.

The Dara Dam was another arch dam built by the Romans in which the historian Procopius would write of its design: "This barrier was not built in a straight line, but was bent into the shape of a crescent, so that the curve, by lying against the current of the river, might be able to offer still more resistance to the force of the stream."

The Mongols also built arch dams in modern-day Iran. Their second dam was built around 1350 and is called the Kurit Dam. The Kurit Dam was of masonry design and built in a very narrow canyon. The canyon was so narrow that its crest length is only 44% of its height. The dam is still erect, even though part of its lower downstream face fell off.

The Tibi Dam in Tibi, Spain was a post-medieval arch dam built between 1579 and 1594 and the first in Europe since the Romans. This arch dam rests on the mountains sides.

In the early 20th century, the world's first variable-radius arch dam was built on the Salmon Creek near Juneau, Alaska. The Salmon Creek Dam's upstream face bulged upstream, which relieved pressure on the stronger, curved lower arches near the abutments. The dam also had a larger toe, which off-set pressure on the upstream heel of the dam, which now curved more downstream. The technology and economical benefits of the Salmon Creek Dam allowed for larger and taller dam designs. The dam was, therefore, revolutionary, and similar designs were soon adopted around the world, in particular by the U.S. Bureau of Reclamation.

In 1920, the Swiss engineer and dam designer Alfred Stucky developed new calculation methods for arch dams, introducing the concept of elasticity during the construction of the Montsalvens arch dam in Switzerland, thereby improving the dam profile in the vertical direction by using a parabolic arch shape instead of a circular arch shape.

Pensacola Dam, completed in the state of Oklahoma in 1940, was considered the longest multiple arch dam in the United States.

Arch dam designs would continue to test new limits and designs such as the double- and multiple-curve. The Swiss engineer Alfred Stucky and the U.S. Bureau of Reclamation would develop a method of weight and stress distribution in the 1960s, and arch dam construction in the United States would see its last surge then with dams like the 143-meter double-curved Morrow Point Dam in Colorado, completed in 1968. By the late 20th century, arch dam design reached a relative uniformity in design around the world. Currently, the tallest arch dam in the world is the  Jingpin-I Dam in China, which was completed in 2013. The longest multiple arch with buttress dam in the world is the Daniel-Johnson Dam in Quebec, Canada. It was completed in 1968 and put in service in 1970.

Pensacola Dam was one of the last multiple arch types built in the United States. Its NRHP application states that this was because three dams of this type failed: (1) Gem Lake Dam, St. Francis Dam (California), Lake Hodges Dam (California). None of these failures were inherently caused by the multiple arch design.

Design 
The design of an arch dam is a very complex process. It starts with an initial dam layout, that is continually improved until the design objectives are achieved within the design criteria.

Loads
The main loads for which an arch dam is designed are:
 Dead load
 Hydrostatic load generated by the reservoir and the tailwater
 Temperature load
 Earthquake load

Other miscellaneous loads that affect a dam include: ice and silt loads, and uplift pressure.

Most often, the arch dam is made of concrete and placed in a "V"-shaped valley. The foundation or abutments for an arch dam must be very stable and proportionate to the concrete. There are two basic designs for an arch dam: constant-radius dams, which have constant radius of curvature, and variable-radius dams, which have both upstream and downstream curves that systematically decrease in radius below the crest. A dam that is double-curved in both its horizontal and vertical planes may be called a dome dam. Arch dams with more than one contiguous arch or plane are described as multiple-arch dams. Early examples include the Roman Esparragalejo Dam with later examples such as the Daniel-Johnson Dam (1968) and Itaipu Dam (1982). However, as a result of the failure of the Gleno Dam shortly after it was constructed in 1923, the construction of new multiple arch dams has become less popular.

Contraction joints are normally placed every 20 m in the arch dam and are later filled with grout after the control cools and cures.

Types 
 Constant radii arch dam  the upstream face of the dam has a constant radius making it a linear shape face throughout the height of the dam. But the inner curves their radius reduces as we move down from top elevation to bottom and thus in cross-section it makes a shape of the triangle.
 Variable arch dam  the radius of both inner and outer faces of the dam arch varies from bottom to top.  The radius of the arch is greatest at the top and lowest at lower elevations. The central angle of the arch is also widened as we move upside.
 Constant angle arch dam  this is the most economical in construction. However, for the third type of arch dam stronger foundation is required as it involves overhangs at the abutment sections.  The constant angle arch dam is that in which the central angles of the horizontal arch rings are of the same magnitude at all elevations.

Examples of arch dams 

 Buchanan Dam (example of multiple-arch type)
 Contra Dam
 Daniel-Johnson Dam
 Deriner Dam
 El Atazar Dam
 Enguri Dam
 Flaming Gorge Dam
 Glen Canyon Dam
 Hartbeespoort Dam
 Idukki Dam
 Kariba Dam
 Karun-3 Dam
 Luzzone Dam
 Mauvoisin Dam
 Mratinje Dam
 New Bullards Bar Dam
 Pensacola Dam
 St. Francis Dam
 Victoria Dam
 Xiluodu Dam
Hoover Dam
Bhumibol Dam

See also 
 Arch-gravity dam
 Gravity dam
 Parabolic arch

References

External links 

 PBS.org:  Dam Basics
 Historical Development of Arch Dams. From Cut-Stone Arches to Modern Concrete Designs 
 Key Developments in the History of Arch Dams, from archive.org

 
Dams by type
Arches and vaults
.
Concrete buildings and structures
Masonry dams